William Martin Aiken (April 1, 1855 – December 7, 1908) was an American architect who served as Supervising Architect of the United States Treasury and oversaw and participated in the design and construction of numerous federal buildings during his appointment that now reside on the National Register of Historic Places.

Early life
William Aiken was born in Charleston, South Carolina and educated at The University of the South from 1872 to 1874. He taught at his alma mater in his last year of attendance and moved to Charleston to teach a special course in architecture. In 1877, he moved to Boston, MA and continued to teach Architecture at MIT until 1879. After leaving MIT, he served under in the office of noted American architect Henry Hobson Richardson and left in 1883 to serve under other architects until 1886. He left Boston to start his own practice in Cincinnati, Ohio.

Supervising Architect
Aiken was appointed as Supervising Architect of the United States Treasury and sworn in on April 1, 1895. During his short tenure, he oversaw the design of many notable federal buildings such as the Denver and Philadelphia mints. He resigned his position on June 30, 1897 to practice architecture in New York with Bruce Price and act as a consultant architect to the City of New York.

Death
Aiken died on December 7, 1908 during an operation at a New York City Hospital.

Notable buildings

 Denver Mint (Initial Design) – Denver, Colorado, 1896
 the third Philadelphia Mint building, Philadelphia, Pennsylvania, 1896
 expansion of the Federal Office Building, New York City, 1896
 Pueblo Federal Building, Pueblo, Colorado, 1897
 Federal Courthouse and Post Office, Mankato, Minnesota, 1897
 Allegheny Post Office, Pittsburgh, Pennsylvania, 1897
 the Châteauesque United States Post Office, now the Castle Museum, Saginaw, Michigan, 1898
 Customs House Museum and Cultural Center, Clarksville, Tennessee, 1898
 alteration of New York City Hall, 1903
 bandstand, White Point Garden, Charleston, South Carolina, 1907
 East 23rd Street Bathhouse, New York City, with Arnold W. Brunner, 1907
 U.S. Post Office and Courthouse, San Francisco, California

References

External links
William Martin Aiken Papers at College of Charleston

19th-century American architects
1855 births
1908 deaths
Architects from South Carolina
Artists from Charleston, South Carolina
Sewanee: The University of the South alumni
Sewanee: The University of the South faculty
20th-century American architects